Glenn E. Tidd (April 23, 1894 – October 3, 1970) was an American football player.  An Ohio native, he played professional football as a center, guard, tackle, and back for the Dayton Triangles in the National Football League (NFL). He appeared in 31 NFL games, five as a starter, from 1920 to 1924.

References

1894 births
1970 deaths
Dayton Triangles players
Players of American football from Ohio
People from Jamestown, Ohio